RMS is an English jazz fusion band formed in 1982. It consists of three well known and acclaimed British session musicians. Guitarist, Ray Russell, bass player, Mo Foster and drummer Simon Phillips.

As of mid-2007, RMS have started touring the UK. Due to his commitments with Toto, Simon Phillips has been replaced with Gary Husband. They have performed a few small shows in the south of England with further shows planned throughout the UK in 2008.

Discography
 Centennial Park (1984, 2004)
 RMS Live at the Venue 1982 (2005)
 RMS Live at the Montreux Jazz Festival 1983 (with Gil Evans) (DVD, 2006)

External links 

Angel Air Records

English jazz ensembles
English rock music groups
Jazz fusion ensembles